This is a list of listed buildings in the parish of Blantyre in South Lanarkshire, Scotland.

List 

|}

Key

Notes

References
 All entries, addresses and coordinates are based on data from Historic Scotland. This data falls under the Open Government Licence

External links
Listed Buildings in Blantyre Ward, South Lanarkshire at British Listed Buildings

Blantyre
Blantyre, South Lanarkshire